The Great Mosque of Kufa, or Masjid al-Kufa, is located in Kufa, Iraq and is one of the earliest and holiest surviving mosques in the world. The mosque, built in the 7th century, was home to Ali ibn Abi Talib, the 4th Rashidun caliph; and contains the holy shrine of Muslim ibn Aqeel, his companion Hani ibn Urwa; and the revolutionary, Al-Mukhtar. In recent history, the mosque has seen numerous renovations by Dawoodi Bohra.

Origin 
This mosque was for imam ali (as). There is a legend that says the edifice was built on a temple constructed by Adam while another claims that Adam's bones were buried on the site, having been carried by Noah on board the Ark. It is also believed that the angel Gabriel was referring to the mosque when he declared, "Twelve miles of lands from all directions of the mosque are blessed by its holiness." The site was identified in Shia Islam as the place where Noah must build his Ark. The family members of the first Shiite imams and their early supporters were buried within.

Architectural excavations revealed that the mosque, which dates from 670, was built on top of much older foundations.

Architecture
The mosque contains nine sanctuaries and four traditional locations. As to its design, experts recognized similarities to the design of the palaces of pre-Islamic Persia, Whereas according to Ibn al-Athir description, its ceiling resembles the ceiling of Byzantine church. It has four minarets and is accessible through five gates:
Gate of the Threshold,
Gate of Kinda,
Gate of al-Anmat,
Gate of the Snake, and
Gate of Hani ibn Urwa.

Renovation
The Great Mosque of Kufa has previously underwent sporadic renovations. One historical account, for instance, noted enlargement of section as well as a raised flooring for the main building in comparison to earlier level. In 1998, head of Dawoodi Bohra community, Mohammed Burhanuddin started renovating the mosque, which was then completed in early 2010. The renovation included decorations with gold and silver, the Mihrab being made with a gold zari, and the whole interior being surrounded with verse of the Quran. In addition, the courtyard is covered in white marble from Makrana, India.

Significance

 It was the place where Ali ibn Abi Talib was fatally wounded by a poison-coated sword while prostrating in the Fajr prayer.
 Contains the tombs of Muslim ibn Aqeel, Hani ibn Urwa, and Al-Mukhtar
 There are markers within the mosque indicating the locations for where the court of Ali used to preside, where he performed miracles, and where Zayn al-Abidin and Ja'far al-Sadiq used to perform Salah
 Islamic traditions relate that it was the dwelling place of Nuh (Noah) and that this was the place where he built the Ark
 According to Shia belief, it was from this mosque that the diluvium of Noah started submerging earth, as well as being the place from where the water was re-absorbed  - also marked within the Mosque
 Ja'far al-Sadiq said that up to twelve miles of land in all directions from the mosque are blessed by its holiness.
 Ja'far al-Sadiq was also recorded as remarking that the "mosque in Kufa is superior to that of Jerusalem" and that "performing two prostrations of prayer here would be better for me than ten others at any mosque."
 There are also Shia traditions which state that performing one prayer in this mosque is the same as having performed one thousand prayers elsewhere, and performing one obligatory prayer here is equal to having performed an accepted Hajj
 The secretariat of Al-Kufa Mosque and its shrines describes the mosque as being one of the sole four dignified mosques to which Muslims must travel, and that it comes in third place after the Kaaba and the mosque of Prophet."
 According to Shia belief, it is from this mosque that the messianic twelfth Imam, Hujjat-Allah al-Mahdi, will rule the world from, and it will serve as the seat of his power in the end of times.

See also

 Holiest sites in Islam (Shia)
 Masjid al-Nabawi
 Masjid al-Haram
 Masjid al-Aqsa
 Masjid al-Hakim
 Masjid al-Husayn, Karbala
 Masjid al-Husayn, Cairo

References

External links

 

7th-century mosques
Architecture in Iraq
Islamic holy places
Kufa
Mausoleums in Iraq
Family of Muhammad
Shia mosques in Iraq
Shia shrines
Tourist attractions in Iraq
Grand mosques